Halong may refer to:

 Ha Long, also known as Hong Gai, the capital city of Quang Ninh Province, Vietnam
 Halong Bay, a UNESCO World Heritage site located in Quảng Ninh province, Vietnam
 Halong naval base, an Indonesian Navy (previously Dutch) facility on the island of Ambon
 Typhoon Halong, a pacific typhoon name.